Don't Tell Comedy is a live stand-up comedy company, that creates pop-up comedy shows in unique, non-traditional locations in over 50 cities in the United States. They are based in Los Angeles, CA and were founded in 2017.

History
The company was founded by Kyle Kazanjian-Amory in 2017 who wanted to create local stand-up shows that felt more both more casual than a comedy club and more professional than other local independent shows. The company first started producing shows in locations around Los Angeles before expanding to other cities.

In March 2020, Don't Tell Comedy had to cancel shows and stop running live events due to the coronavirus pandemic. The company began creating digital content and livestreamed events, including a trivia format and private corporate events.

As of 2022, the company has produced shows in more than 50 cities in the United States, including 
Atlanta, 
Chicago, 
Denver, 
Grand Rapids, 
Las Vegas, 
Milwaukee, 
Nashville,
Palo Alto, 
San Diego, 
San Francisco, and others.

Shows

The typical Don't Tell Comedy show is held in a non-traditional venue with an average of five comedians, running for roughly 90 minutes. When selling tickets to events, only the date, time, and neighborhood are advertised. The specific location is later revealed on the day of the show. The final lineup is only known at the actual show. Events are normally BYOB.

Some shows have been filmed and posted to the Don't Tell Comedy YouTube channel.

Digital Video
In 2021, Don't Tell Comedy released its first comedy special with comedian Danny Jolles. The video was released in collaboration with 800 Pound Gorilla Records and was distributed via YouTube and Amazon Prime Video. The New York Times listed the special as part of their "Best Comedy of 2021" wrap-up, labeling the special as 2021's "Best Grand Unified Theory."

In early 2022, Don't Tell Comedy began releasing digital content on social platforms such as YouTube, Facebook, TikTok, and Instagram, highlighting lineups of emerging comedians across the United States.

Notable performers

References

External links 

 

Entertainment companies established in 2017
Recurring events established in 2017